Agrotis caffer is a moth of the family Noctuidae first described by George Hampson in 1903. It is endemic to Lesotho and South Africa.

External links
 
 

Agrotis
Endemic fauna of Lesotho
Moths of Africa
Moths described in 1903